Panola, Alabama may refer to:
Panola, Crenshaw County, Alabama, an unincorporated community in Crenshaw County
Panola, Sumter County, Alabama, a census-designated place in Sumter County